Ferrol CB is a Spanish basketball team, from Ferrol, in Galicia.

History
Ferrol CB was founded in 2008 as a merger of two teams from the city:
CB Galicia (former LEB team)
CB San Rosendo

In July 2015 the club announced that would dissolve its senior team, playing only in youth leagues.

Season by season

CB San Rosendo

CB Galicia

Ferrol CB

Trophies and awards

Individual awards
LEB Oro MVP
Eric Cuthrell – 1999
LEB Plata MVP
Melvin Simon – 2002

Notes

References

External links
Ferrol CB official website

Basketball teams in Galicia (Spain)
Former Liga EBA teams
Former LEB Oro teams
Former LEB Plata teams
Ferrol, Spain